Yvonne Imoh-Abasi Glory Ekwere  (born March 3, 1987), popularly known as Yvonne Vixen Ekwere, is a Nigerian media personality, content producer and actress who works as the presenter of E-Weekly on Silverbird Television. Since making her debut as a co-host on a late night show on Rhythm 93.7 FM, her style of presenting has seen her win several awards.

Early life and education
Vixen is a native of Akwa Ibom State, Nigeria, but she was born as the last of 7 children in Lagos State, Southwestern Nigeria where she completed her basic and secondary school education at Airforce Primary School, Victoria Island, Lagos and Holy Child College, Lagos respectively. She holds a bachelor's degree in History and International Studies which she obtained from Lagos State University.

Career

Radio/TV career
Her career started in 2008 after she was invited by Ikponmwosa Osakioduwa to be the co-host of a radio show called Dance Party which airs on Rhythm 93.7 FM. Vixen later auditioned and won the role as presenter of Silverbird Television's entertainment show E-Weekly. Her career has since seen her interview notable celebrities and hosted several high-profile events including Most Beautiful Girl in Nigeria 2012 and former President, Goodluck Jonathan's "Dinner With Showbiz Stakeholders" amongst others. In October 2015, she launched her own web series show called Drive Time with Vixen. She cites Oprah Winfrey as her source of inspiration.  She Interview Genevieve Nnaji, Funke Akindele, Denrele Edun & More on their Journey to Success at the 2014 Amstel Malta AMVCA.

Films and soaps
She has starred and made appearances in films and soap operas including 7 Inch Curve, Render to Caesar, Put a Ring on It, and the season 2 of Gidi Up where she starred in 3 episodes.

Awards and recognitions

References

External links

1987 births
Living people
People from Akwa Ibom State
Television personalities from Lagos
21st-century Nigerian actresses
Nigerian television presenters
Nigerian radio presenters
Nigerian women radio presenters
Lagos State University alumni
Silverbird Communications people
Nigerian women television presenters
Holy Child College alumni